Gigi Fernández and Jana Novotná were the defending champions, but participated with different partners in this tournament. Novotná played alongside Larisa Neiland, and lost in the semifinals to Conchita Martínez and Arantxa Sánchez Vicario.

Gigi Fernández played alongside Natasha Zvereva, and successfully defended the title, defeating Martínez and Sánchez Vicario in the final 6–3, 6–2. This was Fernández and Zvereva's first Grand Slam Doubles title as partners; they would go on to win 14 Grand Slam titles, completing the Career Grand Slam together.

Seeds

Draw

Finals

Top half

Section 1

Section 2

Bottom half

Section 3

Section 4

References
 Main draw
1992 French Open – Women's draws and results at the International Tennis Federation

Women's Doubles
French Open by year – Women's doubles
1992 in women's tennis
1992 in French women's sport